This is a list of publications created by Clamp, an all-female Japanese manga artist group. Clamp was originally a simultaneous joint global collaboration with Dark Horse Comics.

Unfinished/current works

Completed works

Early works

Short works
These are short works that were only available in monthly magazines; they were never published in tankōbon form.

Collaborations
{| class="wikitable sortable" width="100%"
! Name !! Collaborated With !! Type !! Contribution
|-
|
|Mizuki Tsujimura
|Novel
|Novel illustrations (1 volume) 
|-
|Blood-C
|Production I.G
|Anime
|Character design and story
|-
|Blood-C: The Last Dark
|Production I.G
|Anime film
|Character design and story
|-
|
|Masaki Okayu
|Novel
|Novel illustrations (1 short story)
|-
|
|Kinema Citrus
|Anime
|Character design concept
|-
|
|Tomiyuki Matsumoto
|Manga
|Manga illustrations and script
|-
|
|Sunrise
|OVA
|Character design
|-
|
|Sunrise, JORO
|Smart phone game
|Character design
|-
|
|Sunrise
|Anime 
|Character design, ending illustrations (season two)
|-
|
|Sunrise
|Anime film
|Character design
|-
|
|Sunrise
|Anime
|Character design
|-
|
|Hiroshi Tsutsui
|Novel
|Novel illustrations (1 volume)
|-
|HiGH&LOW g-sword
|Exile Tribe
|Manga
|Character design, manga illustrations (1 volume) 
|-
|
|Studio Deen
|Anime
|Anime Original Character design
|-
|
|Atsuko Asano
|Novel
|Book illustrations (3 volumes)
|-
|
|Tomiyuki Matsumoto
|Novel
|Book illustrations (1 volumes)
|-
|
|Takeshi Okazaki
|Manga
|Manga script
|-
|
|Aki Nakamura
|Novel
|Novel illustrations (1 volume)
|-
|
|Aki Nakamura
|Novel
|Novel illustrations (1 volume)
|-
|
|Mori Ōgai
|Novem
|Book illustrations
|-
|
|Yōko Tsukumo
|Novel
|Book illustrations
|-
|{{nihongo|Mouryou no Hako|魍魎の匣|Mōryō no Hako}}
|Madhouse Production
|Anime
|Character design
|-
|{{nihongo|Mysteries of Yoshitsune I&II|MOONSAGA-義経秘伝-|MOONSAGA -Yoshitsune Hiden-}}
|Gackt
|Stage play
|Planning Cooperation, Costume Concept Design
|-
|Night Head
|George Iida
|Novel
|Novel illustrations (2 Volumes)
|-
|{{nihongo|Noroi no Kechimyaku|呪の血脈|Noroi no kechimyaku}}
|Kamon Nanami
|Novel
|Novel illustrations (1 Volumes)
|-
|
|Kamon Nanami·Akira
|Manga
|Manga illustrations (1 volume)
|-
|Peter and Wendy
|J. M. Barrie
|Book
|Book illustrations 
|-
|
|Hata Masanori
|Manga
|Manga illustrations and script (1 Volume)
|-
|
|Mori Ōgai
|Book
|Book illustrations
|-
|
|Yoshiki Tanaka
|Novel
|Novel illustrations (12 volumes)
|-
|
|Kamon Nanami
|Novel
|Novel illustrations (1 volume)
|-
|
|Madhouse Production
|Anime
|Character concept and design
|-
|
|Bandai Namco Games
|Video game
|Jin Kazama's 3P costume design
|-
|{{nihongo|Tensai TV-kun MAX|天才てれびくんMAX|tensaiterebikun makkusu}}
|NHK Educational TV
|
|Character Design, Girls Newsletter Character Happiko 
|-
|
|Aki Nakamura
|Novel
|Novel illustrations (1 volume)
|-
|
|Cygames
|Manga
|Cover illustrations
|-
|TBA Untitled Netflix anime
|Netflix
|Anime
|Character design
|-
|}

Clamp has authored other dōjinshi that are not listed above. Having started as a dōjinshi group, most of Clamp's dōjinshi are from their earlier years. A number of Clamp's earlier works are also not listed above.

References